Özel Çağ High School is an international school located in Yenice, Turkey. It serves to different cities including Tarsus, Adana and Mersin.

History
A. Yasar Baybogan founded Çağ College 1986, now it is on a  site on a main road between the cities of Adana and Mersin near Tarsus.

Programmes at Özel Çağ High School
These schools are private, co-educational day schools. The students attending them are from the ages of 6-17. The educational programs at these schools are based on the national educational curriculum of Turkey. The subjects of math and science, are taught in English.  Also, the curriculum includes one year of preparatory English during the last year of middle school, then it is followed by a three-year high school English Program. The English classes are taught by Native English speakers and Turkish English teachers. (Saturday classes are offered from September to June in math, science, and English) The schools also offer an extra academic programme to prepare students for university entrance examinations as well as UCLES and international EFL and young learners examinations. Each year at least 110 students take these exams.

Extracurricular
"There is a wide variety of club activities, along with a varied sports programme. The Student Council at Özel Çağ High School plans some of the social activities. The school aims to develop skills and moral values, so theatrical shows performed by students in Turkish and English at the end of each year and there are performances throughout the year. Theatrical shows performed by students in grades 6-9 are prepared in three languages. Students enjoy piano and violin recitals, conferences, full-day excursions, poetry days, literature days, debates, knowledge competitions and outings and summer visits to England. They are also involved with service projects with local villages, an almshouse and an orphanage. Folk-dancing and modern dancing lessons are also offered to students. Academic, personal and social development are all the basic aims of the Özel Çağ High School's educational programme. Parents are strongly encouraged to be involved with their children's education."

Special features
A multi-media system is used in most of the classrooms at the Özel Çağ High School. The school's facilities include four science laboratories, a 35-student computer lab, an Internet-linked library, video rooms, a multi-purpose room, an indoor gymnasium, music and art rooms, a theatre hall seating over 300 equipped with LCD projection display, tennis and basketball courts, playing fields, an 800-seat dining hall and a football pitch.

Admission
Admission to Özel Çağ High School is based on admission tests (for grades 1–8), then for high school admission is determined through the national entrance examination of Turkey.

Notable alumni
Kıvanç Tatlıtuğ attended the school located in Yenice.

Sources

Cited works
bilgipare.com Biography
List of Secondary Schools in Turkey

References

High schools in Turkey
Education in Mersin
High schools in Mersin